Lwangwa is an administrative ward in the Busokelo District of the Mbeya Region of Tanzania. In 2016 the Tanzania National Bureau of Statistics report there were 11,757 people in the ward, from 10,668 in 2012.

Villages / neighborhoods 
The ward has 4 villages and 15 hamlets.

 Mbigili
 Bunyakasege
 Busilya
 Iloboko
 Mbigili
 Mbisa
 Ngelenge
 Lukasi
 Kiputa
 Kisondela
 Lukasi
 Kitali
 Itiki
 Kitali
 Lupaso
 Ikamambande
 Butumba
 Kitungwa
 Mbande

References

Wards of Mbeya Region